Albert Bank, also known as Prince Albert I Bank, is a submarine bank in the Weddell Sea named for Albert I of Monaco, instrumental in initiating the first GEBCO charts (1903). The name was proposed by Dr. Heinrich Hinze, Alfred Wegener Institute for Polar and Marine Research, Bremerhaven, Germany, and approved in June 1997.

References

Undersea banks of the Southern Ocean